Falls of Barvick is a waterfall in Scotland.
It is a cascades type waterfall.

See also
Waterfalls of Scotland

References

Waterfalls of Scotland